Moderne may refer to:

 Moderne architecture, styles of architecture popular from 1925–1940s
 PWA Moderne, an architectural style in the U.S., 1933–1944
 Streamline Moderne, a branch of Art Deco architecture which peaked in popularity around 1937
 Wiener Moderne, the culture of Vienna, Austria, 1890–1910
 Grand Hotel Moderne, in Lourdes, France
 The Moderne, a high-rise in Milwaukee, Wisconsin
 Gibson Moderne, a modernistic solid body electric guitar released in 1957
 Jacques Moderne (c. 1497–after 1560), Italian-born music publisher active in France

See also 
 Modernisme, a Catalan version of Moderne architecture